Jon Poll (born 1958) is an American film director, editor and producer, best known for his directorial debut with the 2007 film Charlie Bartlett.

Career
Poll is the one of three sons of the late film producer, Martin Poll. He graduated from the University of Southern California's film school in 1981 before becoming a film editor. Between 1982 and 2004, he edited eighteen films, including Weeds (1987), Fire Birds (1990), Cabin Boy (1994), Austin Powers: The Spy Who Shagged Me (1999), Meet the Parents (2000), Austin Powers in Goldmember (2002), Scary Movie 3 (2003) and Meet the Fockers (2004). He was also a co-producer on the television series TV 101, Eerie, Indiana and the film Meet the Fockers, and was an executive producer on The 40-Year-Old Virgin.

Poll made his directorial debut in 2007 with the teen comedy film Charlie Bartlett. He read screenwriter Gustin Nash's film adaptation of C. D. Payne's 1993 novel Youth in Revolt and asked director Jay Roach—with whom he had previously worked on five films—if he had heard of Nash. Roach explained that he had been slated to direct another of Nash's screenplays, Charlie Bartlett, but was forced to back out of the job on the same day. Roach recommended that Poll take the role as director; Poll then pitched himself to the film's producers and was hired. Poll co-produced Sacha Baron Cohen's 2009 mockumentary film Brüno.

Personal life
His father is film producer Martin Poll.

Filmography
He was producer for all films unless otherwise noted.

Film

As editor

As director

Editorial department

Second unit director or assistant director

Thanks

Television

As editor

As director

References

External links

1958 births
Living people
American film directors
American film producers
USC School of Cinematic Arts alumni
American film editors